Bello Muhammad (born 12 February 1962), known as Bello Matawalle, is a Nigerian politician and teacher who has served as the Governor of Zamfara State since 2019. After briefly serving in the Abacha-era state house of assembly and serving as a state commissioner from 1999 to 2003 in the Ahmad Sani Yerima administration in the Fourth Republic, he first won an elected office in 2003 as a member of the House of Representatives for Bakura/Maradun and retained the office until 2015 first as a member of the All Nigeria Peoples Party before switching to the People's Democratic Party in 2011. Four years after losing his Bakura/Maradun Constituency seat in 2015, Matawalle became the 2019 PDP gubernatorial nominee and won the office after a Supreme Court ruling disqualified the original winner. In 2021, he defected from the PDP to the All Progressives Congress after a defection rally in Gusau alongside most Zamfara State elected officials.

Early life and education
Bello Matawalle was born February 12, 1969, in Maradun, which at the time was a part of the Northern Region. He obtained First School Leaving Certificate from Maradun Township Primary School in 1979. He graduated from VTC Bunza in 1984. He attended Yaba College of Technology, Lagos and later went to Thames Valley University, London.

Political career
He worked as a teacher at Government Girls College Moriki and Kwatarkoshi before joining the Federal Ministry of Water Resources. Matawalle's first shot in politics was in 1998 when he ran for a house of assembly seat and won after he left the Federal Ministry of Water Resources, Abuja, joining the defunct United Nigeria Congress Party (UNCP) which consisted of politicians such as Ambassador Isa Aliyu Mohammed Argungu (Sarkin Yakin Kabbi) former Minister of Water Resources and National Chairman of the party, Ibrahim Gusau former pro tem National Chairman of the party, Atiku Abubakar, Abdullahi Aliyu Sumaila, Attahiru Bafarawa, Adamu Aliero, Suleiman Takuma, Ibrahim Kura Mohammed, Ibrahim Saminu Turaki and Kabiru Ibrahim Gaya but after the death of Sani Abacha, Nigerian Military Head of State on June 8, 1998, Abdulsalami Abubakar, his successor, dissolved the political parties and announced that elections would hold in 1999.

Between 1999 and 2003 he served as Zamfara State Commissioner for Local Government and Chieftaincy Affairs, Commissioner for Environment, Rural Development and then Commissioner for Youth and Sports.

Matawalle was elected into the House of Representatives by his constituents Bakura/Maradun in May 2003 on the platform of the defunct All Nigeria Peoples Party (ANPP).

Matawalle was re-elected in 2007 still on the platform of the ANPP only to defect to PDP on which platform he was re-elected for a third term in 2011.

Matawalle polled 189,452 in the March polls as against the 534,541 votes for Muktar Idris, the APC candidate.

Muktar Idris was at first, issued the certificate of return, however, the court of appeal in Sokoto ordered that the INEC should withdraw the certificate.

The Supreme Court later pronounced that the votes cast for the APC in the election as wasted and ordered that the candidate with the second highest votes be sworn in on Wednesday. This is because the APC failed to conduct primary election for all the candidates in Zamfara State.

Defection to APC
On 1 June 2021, Matawalle dissolved his Executive Council, reportedly in preparation for a party switch to the APC set to happen around June 12. Matawalle however, denied that the cabinet dissolution was connected to a party switch and claimed to have not made a decision on changing parties nor set a date.

On June 27, President Muhammadu Buhari's Personal Media aide Bashir Ahmad said Matawalle had joined the APC. The party switch was later confirmed by Matawalle's spokesperson Ibrahim Dosara, who said Matawalle would formally announce the defection on June 29. On June 29, Matawalle, along with all 3 Zamfara Senators, 6 of 7 Representatives, and all 24 House of Assembly members, officially switched to the APC at a rally in Gusau attended by other APC Governors; notably Deputy Governor Mahdi Aliyu Gusau and Anka/Mafara Representative Kabiru Yahaya remained in the PDP. Mai Mala Buni, Yobe State Governor and APC Caretaker Chairman, immediately dissolved all party caretaker committees in Zamfara State and appointed Matawalle as Zamfara APC Leader.

Personal life
Matawalle is married to four wives and has children.

References

Living people
Governors of Zamfara State
All Nigeria Peoples Party politicians
Nigerian Muslims
1969 births
People from Zamfara State